Daze may refer to:

Daze (band), a Eurodance band
Daze, Burkina Faso, a village in Tenkodogo Department, Boulgou, Burkina Faso
Dazexiang (lit. Great Swamp Village), a village in Anhui, China, the place of the Dazexiang Uprising in 209 BCE
Éric Dazé (born 1975), Canadian ice hockey winger
"Daze", a song by Doug Wimbish from the album Trippy Notes for Bass

See also

Dazed, a British style magazine
Dazed and Confused (disambiguation)